Frévent is a commune in the Pas-de-Calais department in the Hauts-de-France region of France.

Geography

History
The year 1137 saw the establishment of a Cistercian abbey by the Count de Saint-Pol at the hamlet of Cercamp. The town was invaded in 1537 by the French, and the castle was burned down in 1543 by the Duke of Vendôme. Frévent was partially destroyed by Allied bombing in 1944 during the Second World War.

Population
The inhabitants are called Fréventins.

Places of interest
 The church of St. Hilaire, dating from the sixteenth century.
 The church of St. Vaast, dating from the twentieth century.
 The chateau at Cercamp, dating from the nineteenth century.
 The abbey and park at Cercamp.
 A former flour mill.
 The Louis Ducatel Museum, housing works of the painter Louis Ducatel, local archaeology, costumes and sculptures.
 The Wintenberger Museum, with a history of flour mills and a collection of tools and farm equipment.

See also
 Communes of the Pas-de-Calais department

References

Communes of Pas-de-Calais